Adam Ottley (1655 – 3 October 1723) was an English churchman, Bishop of St David's from 1713 until his death.

Life
He was the son of Sir Richard Ottley of Pitchford, Shropshire, and his wife,  Lady Lettice Ridgeway, daughter of Robert Ridgeway, 2nd Earl of Londonderry. He was baptised on 5 January 1655 at Pitchford. He matriculated at Trinity College, Cambridge in 1672, graduating B.A. in 1676 and M.A. in 1679. He then became a Fellow of Trinity Hall, Cambridge (1680–1684), and graduated D.D. in 1690.

He became rector of Pontesbury, prebendary of Hereford Cathedral, and then Archdeacon of Shropshire. He was nominated to the see of St David's at the end of 1712, with support from James Brydges, 1st Duke of Chandos. An active diocesan bishop, he came into conflict with Griffith Jones.

Notes

1653 births
1723 deaths
Bishops of St Davids
Archdeacons of Shropshire
Fellows of Trinity Hall, Cambridge
18th-century Welsh Anglican bishops
Alumni of Trinity Hall, Cambridge